Todd Rivaldo Albert Ferre (born 15 March 1999) is an Indonesian professional footballer who plays as an attacking midfielder and right winger for Liga 1 club PSS Sleman.

Club career

Early career
Before becoming a football player, Rivaldo started his career as a futsal player.

Then, he received an offer to join the Persipura U-19 team. He helped Persipura to win the 2017 Liga 1 U-19 also scored a freekick in the final match 
against Persib U-19. 
Persipura coach at that time, Peter Butler, then called Rivaldo to play in the senior team.

Persipura Jayapura

2018 season: First team breakthrough
Rivaldo made his debut in 2018 Liga 1 when Persipura were beaten 1-3 by Arema. He scored a goal in the 90th minute. Although, his goal did not save Mutiara Hitam from defeat. He scored and assisted a goal, in a 6–0 win against Madura United. Persipura finished 12th in the league, with Rivaldo making 15 appearances and scored 3 goals.

2019 season: Best Young Player and Team of the season
On 2 October 2019, Rivaldo scored a brace in Persipura 3–0 win against Persikabo 1973. On 11 November, Rivaldo scored a late equaliser to make the score 2–2 against Bali United. He made 29 appearances and scored 5 goal, helping Persipura finish 3rd in the league. He was awarded the Best Young Player Award,  beating other contestant Terens Puhiri  and Asnawi Mangkualam, also awarded as Team of The Season.

2020 season
Rivaldo started against Persebaya, as Persipura won 3–4. Rivaldo played all Persipura game until matchday 3, as the league was postponed and then cancelled.

Lampang F.C. (loan)
In February 2021, Rivaldo was loaned to Thai League 2 club,  Lampang. He was loaned for the remainder of the season. On 7 February, Rivaldo made his league debut coming on as 95th-minute substitute for Jeerachai Ladadok in a 2–0 win against Uthai Thani. Rivaldo scored his first goal against Nongbua Pitchaya as his team drew 1-1. Rivaldo helped Lampang to finish 12th with 12 appearances and 1 goal.

2021-22 season: Return to Persipura
After a short stint at Thailand, Rivaldo returned to Persipura. Rivaldo started in Persipura's first league game against Persita Tangerang, but couldn't help his team avoid a 1–2 defeat.

PSS Sleman
On 12 May 2022, Ferre joined PSS Sleman. He made his league debut on 23 July 2022 in a match against PSM Makassar at the Maguwoharjo Stadium, Sleman.

International career
In 2018, Rivaldo represented the Indonesia U-19, in the 2018 AFC U-19 Championship. Rivaldo scored a hat-trick in a group stage match against Qatar U-19, which Indonesia U-19 lost 6–5.

Career statistics

Club

Honours

Club
Persipura U-19
 Liga 1 U-19: 2017

International
Indonesia U-19
 AFF U-19 Youth Championship third place: 2018
Indonesia U-22
 AFF U-22 Youth Championship: 2019

Individual
 Liga 1 U-19 Best Player: 2017
 Liga 1 Best Young Player: 2019
 Liga 1 Team of the Season: 2019
 Indonesian Soccer Awards: Best Young  Footballer 2019

References

External links
 Todd Rivaldo at Liga Indonesia

1999 births
Living people
Indonesian footballers
Indonesian men's futsal players
People from Jayapura
Papuan people
Persipura Jayapura players
Todd Rivaldo Ferre
PSS Sleman players
Liga 1 (Indonesia) players
Todd Rivaldo Ferre
Indonesian expatriate footballers
Expatriate footballers in Thailand
Indonesian expatriate sportspeople in Thailand
Indonesia youth international footballers
Association football midfielders
Sportspeople from Papua